Torbay Hospital is the main hospital of South Devon, England. It is managed by the Torbay and South Devon NHS Foundation Trust.

History
The hospital was founded as the Torbay Hospital, Provident Dispensary and Eye Infirmary in 1844. 
Construction started in 1850, with the first wing being completed in 1851 and a second wing being added in 1878.

After the hospital management decided to build a new hospital, a property known as Hengrave House was purchased from Major K.P. Kitson and a design was developed by Percy Adams. Much of the finance was donated by Ella and Violet Wills, daughters of Sir Edward Payson Wills, 1st Baronet. The new facility was officially opened in 1928 and a chapel, which had been designed by Charles Holden, was added in 1930. The hospital joined the National Health Service in 1948.

Services
The hospital contains an accident & emergency department, which is open 24 hours a day, 365 days a year and has a grass helipad.

The hospital has 650 parking spaces for visitors and 1,100 for staff, who pay at rates linked to their earnings.

See also 
 List of hospitals in England

References

External links

Hospital buildings completed in 1925
Hospitals in Devon
Charles Holden buildings
Buildings and structures in Torquay
Hospitals established in 1844
NHS hospitals in England